Ocotea rivularis is a species of evergreen tree in the plant genus Ocotea of the family Lauraceae. It is endemic to Costa Rica.

References

rivularis
Endemic flora of Costa Rica
Trees of Central America
Taxonomy articles created by Polbot